Elaine N. Aron is an American clinical research psychologist and author. Aron has published numerous books and scholarly articles about inherited temperament and interpersonal relationships, especially on the subject of sensory processing sensitivity, beginning with The Highly Sensitive Person (1996), which has sold over a million copies.

Education

Aron graduated Phi Beta Kappa from the University of California, Berkeley,  and later earned a Master of Arts in clinical psychology from York University (Toronto) and a Ph.D. in clinical depth psychology at Pacifica Graduate Institute (Santa Barbara, California). She interned at the C. G. Jung Institute in San Francisco.

Professional practice and personal life
Aron maintains a psychotherapy practice in Mill Valley, California.

Aron is married to SUNY-Stony Brook psychology professor Arthur Aron, with whom she collaborates in studies of the interaction of childhood environment with SPS in predicting adult functioning. In nearly 50 years of studying love, the couple developed a 36-question list, since used in hundreds of studies, to create closeness in a lab setting, to break down barriers between strangers, and improve understanding between police officers and community members.

Aron's son is television writer Elijah Aron.

Published works

Books
 The Highly Sensitive Person: How to Thrive When the World Overwhelms You (1996)
 The Highly Sensitive Person's Workbook (1999)
 The Highly Sensitive Person in Love: Understanding and Managing Relationships When the World Overwhelms You (2001)
 The Highly Sensitive Child: Helping Our Children Thrive When the World Overwhelms Them (2002)
 The Undervalued Self: Restore Your Love/Power Balance, Transform the Inner Voice That Holds You Back, and Find Your True Self-Worth (2010)
 Psychotherapy and the Highly Sensitive Person: Improving Outcomes for That Minority of People Who Are the Majority of Clients (2010)
 The Highly Sensitive Parent: Be Brilliant in Your Role, Even When the World Overwhelms You (2020)

Scholarly journal articles
 
  Note 3 (p. 195) cites Chen et al. (1992) re social and cultural unacceptability adding to environmental stressors.
 Aron, Elaine N., Ph.D., (July 21, 2011) "Understanding the Highly Sensitivity Person: Sensitive, Introverted, or Both? | Extraverted HSPs face unique challenges" Psychology Today.

Magazine articles

See also
 Sensory processing sensitivity
 Personality psychology
 Social psychology
 Differential susceptibility hypothesis

References

External links
The Highly Sensitive Person: An Interview with Elaine Aron Uploaded February 1, 2010

Living people
York University alumni
American women psychologists
21st-century American psychologists
University of California, Berkeley alumni
1944 births
21st-century American women
20th-century American psychologists